Calligaria is a small village (curazia) of San Marino. It belongs to the municipality of Faetano.

See also
Faetano
Cà Chiavello
Corianino
Monte Pulito

Curazie in San Marino
Faetano